Apnenik pri Velikem Trnu is a settlement in the hills east of Krško in eastern Slovenia. The area is part of the traditional region of Lower Carniola. It is now included with the rest of the municipality in the Lower Sava Statistical Region.

Name
The name of the settlement was changed from Apnenik to Apnenik pri Velikem Trnu in 1953.

References

External links
Apnenik pri Velikem Trnu on Geopedia

Populated places in the Municipality of Krško